The 3rd Grand Prix du Salon was a Formula One motor race held on 16 November 1947 at the Autodrome de Linas-Montlhéry, in Montlhéry near Paris.

The 48-lap race was won by Talbot-Lago driver Yves Giraud-Cabantous. Eugène Chaboud in another Talbot-Lago was second and Charles Pozzi was third in a Delahaye. Talbot-Lago driver Louis Chiron started from pole but failed to finish, as did Raymond Sommer who set fastest lap in a Maserati.

Results

References

Salon